Velichov is a municipality and village in Karlovy Vary District in the Karlovy Vary Region of the Czech Republic. It has about 500 inhabitants.

Notable people
Bedřich Diviš Weber (1766–1842), composer and musicologist

References

External link

Villages in Karlovy Vary District